Arin Hadley Wright (born Arin Hadley Walton Gilliland; December 25, 1992) is an American soccer player who currently plays for the Chicago Red Stars in the National Women's Soccer League. Wright was also recently loaned to Australian club Newcastle Jets for the 2018–19 W-League season.

Gilliland played her collegiate soccer for Kentucky Wildcats. On January 16, 2015, the Chicago Red Stars selected Gilliland as the eighth overall pick in the 2015 NWSL College Draft.

College

In 2014, while at Kentucky, Gilliland was awarded the Honda Inspiration Award which is given to a collegiate athlete "who has overcome hardship and was able to return to play at the collegiate level". She overcame a serious injury and the loss of her mother to cancer as a freshman, but rebounded to become one of the top soccer players in the country.

Club career

Youth career
Arin Gilliland attended and played for West Jessamine High School where she was named All-American, as well as Kentucky's Miss Soccer.
Gilliland played club soccer for Ohio Elite. In 2007 was named second team All-State, and in 2008 was named Underclassman Athlete of the Year of Jessamine County, and Academic First Team Region 14. In 2009 was named Central Kentucky Soccer Conference Most Valuable Player. Gilliland was named to Kentucky First team All-State in 2009 and 2010.

Kentucky Wildcats
Gilliland played for Kentucky Wildcats from 2011 to 2014 during which she was named First Team All-American, ESPNW Female Athlete of the Year finalist, SEC Defensive Player of the Year, First Team All-SEC, 2014 HONDA Award winner,
and MAC Hermann Award finalist.
During her four years playing for Wildcats Gilliland played over 7,000 minutes, scored 30 goals and provided 25 assists. Gilliland set a new Wildcat record of eight career game-winning goals.

Chicago Red Stars
Gilliland was selected with the eighth overall pick in the 2015 NWSL College Draft by the Chicago Red Stars. The Red Stars had acquired the pick along with an international roster spot for the 2014 and 2015 seasons from FC Kansas City in exchange for defender Amy LePeilbet. In her first season, Gilliland played 19 games for the Red Stars, starting in 17, for a total of 1533 minutes and provided 2 assists.

In 2016, she was named to the NWSL Best XI for the season and nominated for the Defender of the Year award.

In 2017, Wright appeared in all 24 regular season matches for the Red Stars and their single post-season appearance. Wright started in 24 of those games, resulting in a combined total of 2,130 minutes on the field and 4 assists.

Loan to Newcastle Jets
On November 1, 2016, Gilliland joined Newcastle Jets on loan. In October 2017 she extended her loan for another season.

On November 26, 2018, Wright returned to Newcastle for the remainder of the 2018-19 W-League season, marking her third consecutive year with the team.

International career
Arin Gilliland competed with United States youth national teams at various age-groups:under-15,
under-18,
under-20,
under-23,
Gilliland received her first international call up to the senior team on October 6, 2016. Wright's call-up marks the first time a University of Kentucky player has been chosen to play for the USWNT.

Personal
Arin Wright is the daughter of Letita and Bruce Gilliland, and has a sibling Saylor. Her mother had great influence on her soccer career. She married her husband Evan Wright in October 2018. In October 2019, the two announced they were expecting a baby in April 2020.

References

External links 
 

1992 births
Living people
American women's soccer players
Kentucky Wildcats women's soccer players
Chicago Red Stars players
Newcastle Jets FC (A-League Women) players
National Women's Soccer League players
A-League Women players
Women's association football defenders
Soccer players from Kentucky
Sportspeople from Lexington, Kentucky
Expatriate women's soccer players in Australia
Chicago Red Stars draft picks
Ottawa Fury (women) players
USL W-League (1995–2015) players
Expatriate women's soccer players in Canada
American expatriate sportspeople in Canada
American expatriate sportspeople in Australia